Thijme Verheijen (born 13 April 2003) is a Dutch professional footballer who plays as a midfielder for Eerste Divisie club VVV Venlo.

Career
Verheijen made his debut in the Eerste Divisie for VVV-Venlo on 13 August 2021 away at TOP Oss in a 2–1 defeat at their Frans Heesen Stadion.

Verheijen scored his first goal for VVV on 12 August 2022 against De Graafschap away at the Stadion de Vijverberg in a 2–1 victory.

Such was his form at the start of the 2022–23 season, Verheijen was described as the "revelation of the early season" for VVV. Praise has come for his late attacking runs into the box as well as his success in personal duels.

Career statistics

References

External links
 

Living people
2003 births
Dutch footballers
VVV-Venlo players
Eerste Divisie players
Sportspeople from Helmond
Footballers from North Brabant
Association football midfielders